Pea seed-borne mosaic virus (PSbMV) is a plant pathogenic virus of the family Potyviridae.

External links
ICTVdB - The Universal Virus Database: Pea seed-borne mosaic virus
Family Groups - The Baltimore Method

Viral plant pathogens and diseases
Potyviruses